Lisbon Bridge may refer to:

Bridges in the United States:
 Lisbon Bridge (Lisbon, North Dakota), over the Sheyenne River in Lisbon, North Dakota

Bridges in Lisbon, Portugal:
 25 de Abril Bridge, a suspension bridge on the Tejo River, connecting Lisbon to the municipality of Almada
 Vasco da Gama Bridge, a cable-stayed bridge over the Tagus River in Parque das Nações